The Joining may refer to:

 The Joining (The Batman character), a fictional character in the animated TV series The Batman
 "The Joining" (The Batman episode), a two-part episode in which the character is introduced
 "The Joining" (The Outer Limits), a television episode

See also
 Join (disambiguation)